The University of Missouri Press is a university press operated by the University of Missouri in Columbia, Missouri and London, England; it was founded in 1958 primarily through the efforts of English professor William Peden. Many publications are by, for, and about Missourians. The press also emphasizes the areas of American and world history; military history; intellectual history; biography; journalism; African American studies; women's studies; American, British, and Latin American literary criticism; political science; regional studies; and creative nonfiction. The press has published 2,000 books since its founding and currently publishes about 30 mostly academic books a year.

Notable publications
Among its notable publications were:
Collected works of Langston Hughes
Collected works of Eric Voegelin
Robert H. Ferrell's Give 'em Hell, Harry series about Harry Truman

Series
The American Military Experience Series, edited by John C. McManus.
The Collected Works of Langston Hughes
The Collected Works of Eric Voegelin
The Eric Voegelin Institute Series in Political Philosophy
The Give 'Em Hell Harry Series, edited by Robert H. Ferrell.
The Mark Twain and His Circle Series, edited by Tom Quirk.
The Missouri Biography Series, edited by William E. Foley.
The Missouri Heritage Readers Series, edited by Rebecca B. Schroeder.
The Shades of Blue and Gray Series, edited by Herman Hattaway, Jon Wakelyn, and Clayton E. Jewett.
The Sports and American Culture Series, edited by Roger Launius.
The Southern Women Series, edited by Theda Perdue, Betty Brandon, and Virginia Bernhard.
The Paul Anthony Brick Lectures, which include works by John Hope Franklin and Sissela Bok.

Reorganization
The university proposed in spring 2012 to close the press and terminate its ten employees in order to end the university's subsidy to the press, estimated by the university administration as $400,000 per year and by outside critics of the closure decision as under $250,000 a year. The decision was reversed in August 2012 after public outcry. As part of the reorganization the press now reports up to the main Columbia campus rather than the University of Missouri System. A new director was hired in 2013.

See also

 List of English-language book publishing companies
 List of university presses

References

External links
University of Missouri Press

Missouri, University of
University of Missouri
Publishing companies based in Columbia, Missouri
Publishing companies established in 1958
Book publishing companies based in Missouri
1958 establishments in Missouri